AFC '34 is a football club from Alkmaar, Netherlands. AFC'34 is competes in the 2017-18 Sunday Eerste Klasse A League (6th tier).

The club won the 1997 KNVB District Cup in the West 1 District.

Famous players

External links
 Official site

Football clubs in the Netherlands
Football clubs in Alkmaar
1934 establishments in the Netherlands
Association football clubs established in 1934
AFC '34